Olivier Rochus was the defending champion but did not compete that year.

Félix Mantilla won in the final 7–6(7–2), 6–4 against David Nalbandian.

Seeds
A champion seed is indicated in bold text while text in italics indicates the round in which that seed was eliminated.

  Àlex Corretja (second round)
  Carlos Moyá (first round)
  Albert Portas (semifinals)
  Tommy Robredo (semifinals)
  Albert Costa (quarterfinals)
  Andreas Vinciguerra (second round)
  Franco Squillari (second round)
  Galo Blanco (second round)

Draw

External links
 2001 Campionati Internazionali di Sicilia draw

Campionati Internazionali di Sicilia
2001 ATP Tour
Camp